Charles Dixon may refer to:

Charles Dixon (artist) (1872–1934), British maritime artist
Charles P. Dixon (1873–1939), English tennis player
Charles Dixon (ornithologist) (1858–1926), English ornithologist
Charles Dixon (judge) (died 1817), British judge and politician 
Charles Dixon (bodybuilder), American professional bodybuilder
Chuck Dixon (born 1954), American comic-book author
Charles Harvey Dixon (1862–1923), British politician

See also
Charlie Dixon (disambiguation)
Charles Dickson (disambiguation)